Bardsir County is in Kerman province, Iran. The capital of the county is the city of Bardsir. At the 2006 census, the county's population was 84,543 in 18,650 households. The following census in 2011 counted 73,738 people in 19,632 households. At the 2016 census, the county's population was 81,983 in 25,315 households.

Administrative divisions

The population history and structural changes of Bardsir County's administrative divisions over three consecutive censuses are shown in the following table. The latest census shows four districts, eight rural districts, and five cities.

References

 

Counties of Kerman Province